The 2017 NHL Entry Draft was the 55th NHL Entry Draft. The draft was held on June 23–24, 2017, at the United Center in Chicago, Illinois. The first three selections were Nico Hischier going to the New Jersey Devils, Nolan Patrick going to the Philadelphia Flyers, and Miro Heiskanen going to the Dallas Stars.

Eligibility
Ice hockey players born between January 1, 1997, and September 15, 1999, were eligible for selection in the 2017 NHL Entry Draft. Additionally, undrafted, non-North American players born in 1996 were eligible for the draft; and those players who were drafted in the 2015 NHL Entry Draft, but not signed by an NHL team and who were born after June 30, 1997, were also eligible to re-enter the draft.

Draft lottery
Since the 2012–13 NHL season all teams not qualifying for the Stanley Cup playoffs have a "weighted" chance at winning the first overall selection. Beginning with the 2014–15 NHL season the NHL changed the weighting system that was used in previous years. Under the new system the odds of winning the draft lottery for the four lowest finishing teams in the league decreased, while the odds for the other non-playoff teams increased. The first three picks overall in this draft were awarded by lottery. The odds of winning the second and third draws increased on a proportional basis depending on which team won the previous draw. In the 2017 draft lottery, the expansion Vegas Golden Knights had the same odds of winning the lottery as the team that finished with the third fewest points in the 2016–17 NHL season (this ended up being the Arizona Coyotes). Vegas earned the lowest possible pick that they could receive, and selected sixth overall in the first-round and third in each subsequent round of this draft. The New Jersey Devils, Philadelphia Flyers and Dallas Stars won the draft lotteries that took place on April 29, 2017, giving them the first, second and third picks overall. New Jersey moved up four spots to earn the first selection, while Philadelphia and Dallas moved up from the thirteenth and eighth spots, respectively. In the process, the Colorado Avalanche, Vancouver Canucks, Vegas Golden Knights and Arizona Coyotes were each knocked down three places from first, second, third and fourth overall, respectively, while the Buffalo Sabres and Detroit Red Wings dropped two spots and the Florida Panthers, Los Angeles Kings, Carolina Hurricanes and Winnipeg Jets each dropped one place.

Top prospects
Source: NHL Central Scouting final (April 11, 2017) ranking.

Selections by round
The order of the 2017 Entry Draft is listed below.

Round one

Notes
 The Arizona Coyotes' first-round pick went to the New York Rangers as the result of a trade on June 23, 2017, that sent Derek Stepan and Antti Raanta to Arizona in exchange for Anthony DeAngelo and this pick.
 The Winnipeg Jets' first-round pick went to the Vegas Golden Knights as the result of a trade on June 21, 2017, that sent Columbus' first-round pick in 2017 to Winnipeg in exchange for Vegas selecting Chris Thorburn in the 2017 NHL Expansion Draft from Winnipeg, a third-round pick in 2019 and this pick.
 The New York Islanders' first-round pick went to the Vegas Golden Knights as the result of a trade on June 21, 2017, that ensured that Vegas selected Jean-Francois Berube in the 2017 NHL Expansion Draft from the Islanders in exchange for Mikhail Grabovski, Jake Bischoff, a second-round pick in 2019 and this pick.
 The Minnesota Wild's first-round pick went to the Arizona Coyotes as the result of a trade on February 26, 2017, that sent Martin Hanzal, Ryan White and a fourth-round pick in 2017 to Minnesota in exchange for Grayson Downing, a second-round pick in 2018, a conditional fourth-round pick in 2019 and this pick.
 The Columbus Blue Jackets' first-round pick went to the Winnipeg Jets as the result of a trade on June 21, 2017, that sent a first-round pick in 2017, a third-round pick in 2019 to Vegas and ensured that Vegas selected Chris Thorburn in the 2017 NHL Expansion Draft from Winnipeg in exchange for this pick.
Vegas previously acquired this pick as the result of a trade on June 21, 2017, that ensured that Vegas selected William Karlsson in the 2017 NHL Expansion Draft from Columbus in exchange for David Clarkson, a second-round pick in 2019 and this pick.
 The Chicago Blackhawks' first-round pick went to the Dallas Stars as the result of a trade on June 23, 2017, that sent Anaheim's first-round pick in 2017 (29th overall) and a third-round pick in 2017 (70th overall) to Chicago in exchange for this pick.
 The Washington Capitals' first-round pick went to the Philadelphia Flyers as the result of a trade on June 23, 2017, that sent Brayden Schenn to St. Louis in exchange for Jori Lehtera, a conditional first-round pick in 2018 and this pick.
St. Louis previously acquired this pick as the result of a trade on February 27, 2017, that sent Kevin Shattenkirk and Pheonix Copley to Washington in exchange for Zach Sanford, Brad Malone, a conditional seventh-round pick in 2017 or 2018, a conditional second-round pick in 2019 and this pick.
 The Anaheim Ducks' first-round pick went to the Chicago Blackhawks as the result of a trade on June 23, 2017, that sent a first-round pick in 2017 (26th overall) to Dallas in exchange for a third-round pick in 2017 (70th overall) and this pick.
Dallas previously acquired this pick as the result of a trade on February 24, 2017, that sent Patrick Eaves to Anaheim in exchange for this pick (being conditional at the time of the trade). The condition – Dallas will receive a first-round pick in 2017 if Anaheim advances to the 2017 Western Conference Final and Eaves plays in at least 50% of their games – was converted on May 10, 2017.
 The Pittsburgh Penguins' first-round pick went to the St. Louis Blues as the result of a trade on June 23, 2017, that sent Ryan Reaves and a second-round pick in 2017 (51st overall) to Pittsburgh in exchange for Oskar Sundqvist and this pick.

Round two

Notes
 The Arizona Coyotes' second-round pick went to the Philadelphia Flyers as the result of a trade on June 24, 2017, that sent a second and third-round pick both in 2017 (44th and 75th overall) and the Islanders' fourth-round pick in 2017 (108th overall) to Arizona in exchange for this pick.
 The Philadelphia Flyers' second-round pick went to the Arizona Coyotes as the result of a trade on June 24, 2017, that sent a second-round pick in 2017 (35th overall) to Philadelphia in exchange for a third-round pick in 2017 (75th overall), the Islanders' fourth-round pick in 2017 (108th overall) and this pick.
 The Tampa Bay Lightning's second-round pick went to the Columbus Blue Jackets as the result of a trade on June 24, 2017, that sent Keegan Kolesar to Vegas in exchange for this pick.
Vegas previously acquired this pick as the result of a trade on June 21, 2017, that ensured that Vegas selected Jason Garrison in the 2017 NHL Expansion Draft from Tampa Bay in exchange for Nikita Gusev, Pittsburgh's fourth-round pick in 2018 and this pick.
 The Calgary Flames' second-round pick went to the Ottawa Senators as the result of a trade on March 1, 2017, that sent Curtis Lazar and Mike Kostka to Calgary in exchange for Jyrki Jokipakka and this pick.
 The Toronto Maple Leafs' second-round pick went to the Tampa Bay Lightning as the result of a trade on February 27, 2017, that sent Brian Boyle to Toronto in exchange for Byron Froese and this pick (being conditional at the time of the trade). The condition – Tampa Bay will receive the highest pick of Ottawa, San Jose or Toronto's second-round picks in 2017 – was converted on April 23, 2017, when Toronto was eliminated from the 2017 Stanley Cup playoffs, ensuring that Toronto's second-round pick would be higher than San Jose or Ottawa's second-round picks.
 The Boston Bruins' second-round pick went to the San Jose Sharks as the result of a trade on June 17, 2017, that sent Mirco Mueller and a fifth-round pick in 2017 to New Jersey in exchange for Nashville's fourth-round pick in 2017 and this pick.
New Jersey previously acquired this pick as the result of a trade on February 29, 2016, that sent Lee Stempniak to Boston in exchange for a fourth-round pick in 2016 and this pick.
 The San Jose Sharks' second-round pick went to the Anaheim Ducks as the result of a trade on June 20, 2016, that sent Frederik Andersen to Toronto in exchange for Pittsburgh's first-round pick in 2016 and this pick (being conditional at the time of the trade). The condition – Anaheim will receive the middle pick of Ottawa, San Jose or Toronto's second-round picks in 2017. – was converted on May 9, 2017, when Ottawa advanced to the 2017 Eastern Conference Final, ensuring that the Sharks second-round pick would be higher than the Senators' and lower than the Maple Leafs'.
Toronto previously acquired this pick as the result of a trade on February 22, 2016, that sent Roman Polak and Nick Spaling to San Jose in exchange for Raffi Torres, a second-round pick in 2018 and this pick.
 The St. Louis Blues' second-round pick went to the Pittsburgh Penguins as the result of a trade on June 23, 2017, that sent Oskar Sundqvist and a first-round pick in 2017 (31st overall) to St. Louis in exchange for Ryan Reaves and this pick.
 The New York Rangers' second-round pick went to the Carolina Hurricanes as the result of a trade on February 28, 2016, that sent Eric Staal to New York in exchange for Aleksi Saarela, a second-round pick in 2016 and this pick.
 The Edmonton Oilers' second-round pick went to the Boston Bruins as compensation for Edmonton hiring Peter Chiarelli as their president and general manager on April 25, 2015.
 The Minnesota Wild's second-round pick went the Buffalo Sabres as the result of a trade on March 2, 2015, that sent Chris Stewart to Minnesota in exchange for this pick.
 The Columbus Blue Jackets' second-round pick went to the Vancouver Canucks as compensation for Columbus hiring John Tortorella as their head coach on October 21, 2015.
 The Washington Capitals' second-round pick went to the Montreal Canadiens as the result of a trade on June 24, 2016, that sent Lars Eller to Washington in exchange for a second-round pick in 2018 and this pick.
 The Ottawa Senators' second-round pick went the Toronto Maple Leafs as the result of a trade on February 9, 2016, that sent Dion Phaneuf, Matt Frattin, Casey Bailey, Ryan Rupert and Cody Donaghey to Ottawa in exchange for Milan Michalek, Jared Cowen, Colin Greening, Tobias Lindberg and this pick.
 The Pittsburgh Penguins' second-round pick went to the Vegas Golden Knights as the result of a trade on June 22, 2017, that sent Trevor van Riemsdyk and a seventh-round pick in 2018 to Carolina in exchange for this pick.
Carolina previously acquired this pick as the result of a trade on February 23, 2017, that sent Ron Hainsey to Pittsburgh in exchange for Danny Kristo and this pick.

Round three

Notes
 The Colorado Avalanche's third-round pick went the New Jersey Devils as the result of a trade on February 29, 2016, that sent Eric Gelinas to Colorado in exchange for this pick.
 The Arizona Coyotes' third-round pick went to the Florida Panthers as the result of a trade on August 25, 2016, that sent Dave Bolland and Lawson Crouse to Arizona in exchange for a conditional second-round pick in 2018 and this pick (being conditional at the time of the trade). The condition – Florida will receive the better of Arizona or Detroit's third-round picks in 2017 – was converted on March 29, 2017, when Detroit clinched a better regular season record than Arizona for the 2016–17 NHL season.
 The New Jersey Devils' third-round pick went to the Carolina Hurricanes as the result of a trade on March 5, 2014, that sent Tuomo Ruutu to New Jersey in exchange for Andrei Loktionov and this pick (being conditional at the time of the trade). The condition and date of conversion are unknown.
 The Buffalo Sabres' third-round pick went to the Montreal Canadiens as the result of a trade on June 17, 2017, that sent Nathan Beaulieu to Buffalo in exchange for this pick.
 The Detroit Red Wings' third-round pick went to the Arizona Coyotes as the result of a trade on June 20, 2016, that sent Maxim Letunov and a sixth-round pick in 2017 to San Jose in exchange for a fourth-round pick in 2016 and this pick.
San Jose previously acquired this pick as the result of a trade on May 26, 2016, that sent Dylan Sadowy to Detroit in exchange for this pick.
 The Dallas Stars' third-round pick went to the Chicago Blackhawks as the result of a trade on June 23, 2017, that sent a first-round pick in 2017 (26th overall) to Dallas in exchange for Anaheim's first-round pick in 2017 (29th overall) and this pick.
 The Florida Panthers' third-round pick went to the Detroit Red Wings as the result of a trade on March 1, 2017, that sent Thomas Vanek to Florida in exchange for Dylan McIlrath and this pick (being conditional at the time of the trade). The condition – Detroit will receive a third-round pick in 2017 if Florida fails to qualify for the 2017 Stanley Cup playoffs – was converted on March 30, 2017.
 The Philadelphia Flyers' third-round pick went to the Arizona Coyotes as the result of a trade on June 24, 2017, that sent a second-round pick in 2017 (35th overall) to Philadelphia in exchange for a second-round pick in 2017 (44th overall), the Islanders' fourth-round pick in 2017 (108th overall) and this pick.
 The Calgary Flames' third-round pick went to the Edmonton Oilers as the result of a trade on June 24, 2017, that sent St. Louis' third-round pick and Vancouver's fifth-round pick both in 2017 (82nd and 126th overall) to Arizona in exchange for this pick.
Arizona previously acquired this pick as the result of a trade on February 20, 2017, that sent Michael Stone to Calgary in exchange for a conditional fifth-round pick in 2018 and this pick.
 The Toronto Maple Leafs' third-round pick went to the Detroit Red Wings as compensation for Toronto hiring Mike Babcock as their head coach on May 20, 2015.
 The Boston Bruins' third-round pick went the Philadelphia Flyers as the result of a trade on June 29, 2015, that sent Zac Rinaldo to Boston in exchange for this pick.
 The San Jose Sharks' third-round pick went to the New Jersey Devils as compensation for San Jose signing Peter DeBoer as their head coach on May 28, 2015.
 The St. Louis Blues' third-round pick went to the Arizona Coyotes as the result of a trade on June 24, 2017, that sent Calgary's third-round pick in 2017 (78th overall) to Edmonton in exchange for Vancouver's fifth-round pick in 2017 (126th overall) and this pick.
Edmonton previously acquired this pick as the result of a trade on October 7, 2016, that sent Nail Yakupov to St. Louis in exchange for Zach Pochiro and this pick (being conditional at the time of the trade). The condition – Edmonton will receive a third-round pick in 2017 if Yakupov scores 14 or fewer goals in the 2016–17 season – was converted on April 9, 2017, when Yakupov finished the season with 3 goals.
 The New York Rangers' third-round pick went to the Detroit Red Wings as the result of a trade on February 28, 2017, that sent Brendan Smith to New York in exchange for Ottawa's second-round pick in 2018 and this pick.
 The Chicago Blackhawks' third-round pick went to the Detroit Red Wings as the result of a trade on February 24, 2017, that sent Tomas Jurco to Chicago in exchange for this pick.
Chicago previously re-acquired this pick as the result of a trade on June 15, 2016, that sent Teuvo Teravainen and Bryan Bickell to Carolina in exchange for the Rangers' second-round pick in 2016 and this pick.
Carolina previously acquired this pick as the result of a trade on September 11, 2015, that sent Dennis Robertson, Jake Massie and a fifth-round pick in 2017 to Chicago in exchange for Kris Versteeg, Joakim Nordstrom and this pick.
 The Washington Capitals' third-round pick went to the Buffalo Sabres as the result of a trade on February 23, 2016, that sent Mike Weber to Washington in exchange for this pick.
 The Ottawa Senators' third-round pick went to the Chicago Blackhawks as the result of a trade on April 28, 2017, that sent Scott Darling to Carolina in exchange for this pick.
Carolina previously acquired this pick as the result of a trade on February 28, 2017, that sent Viktor Stalberg to Ottawa in exchange for this pick.

Round four

Notes
 The Arizona Coyotes' fourth-round pick went to the Minnesota Wild as the result of a trade on February 26, 2017, that sent Grayson Downing, a first-round pick in 2017, a second-round pick in 2018 and a conditional fourth-round pick in 2019 to Arizona in exchange for Martin Hanzal, Ryan White and this pick.
 The Florida Panthers' fourth-round pick went to the San Jose Sharks as the result of a trade on June 24, 2017, that sent Nashville's fourth-round pick and a sixth-round pick both in 2017 (123rd and 174th overall) to the New York Rangers in exchange for this pick.
The Rangers previously acquired this pick as the result of a trade on June 20, 2016, that sent Keith Yandle to Florida in exchange for a sixth-round pick in 2016 and this pick (being conditional at the time of the trade). The condition – New York will receive a fourth-round pick in 2017 if Florida re-signs Yandle for the 2016–17 NHL season – was converted on June 23, 2016.
 The Tampa Bay Lightning's fourth-round pick went to the Philadelphia Flyers as the result of a trade on March 1, 2017, that sent Mark Streit to Tampa Bay in exchange for Valtteri Filppula, a conditional seventh-round pick in 2017 and this pick.
 The New York Islanders' fourth-round pick went to the Arizona Coyotes as the result of a trade on June 24, 2017, that sent a second-round pick in 2017 (35th overall) to Philadelphia in exchange for a second and third-round pick both in 2017 (44th and 75th overall) and this pick.
Philadelphia previously acquired this pick as the result of a trade on June 25, 2016, that sent San Jose's fourth-round pick in 2016 to New York in exchange for this pick.
 The San Jose Sharks' fourth-round pick went to the Chicago Blackhawks as the result of a trade on June 24, 2017, that sent Carolina's fifth-round pick and a sixth-round pick both in 2017 (135th and 181st overall) to Vancouver in exchange for this pick.
Vancouver previously acquired this pick as the result of a trade on February 28, 2017, that sent Jannik Hansen to San Jose in exchange for Nikolay Goldobin and this pick (being conditional at the time of the trade). The condition – Vancouver will receive a fourth-round pick in 2017 if San Jose does not win the Stanley Cup during the 2016–17 NHL season – was converted on April 22, 2017.
 The New York Rangers' fourth-round pick went to the Colorado Avalanche as the result of a trade on June 25, 2016, that sent Nick Holden to New York in exchange for this pick.
 The Montreal Canadiens' fourth-round pick went to the Los Angeles Kings as the result of a trade on May 9, 2017, that sent Ben Bishop to Dallas in exchange for this pick.
Dallas previously acquired this pick as the result of a trade on February 27, 2017, that sent Jordie Benn to Montreal in exchange for Greg Pateryn and this pick.
 The Nashville Predators' fourth-round pick went to the New York Rangers as the result of a trade on June 24, 2017, that sent Florida's fourth-round pick in 2017 (102nd overall) to San Jose in exchange for a sixth-round pick in 2017 (174th overall) and this pick.
San Jose previously acquired this pick as the result of a trade on June 17, 2017, that sent Mirco Muller and a fifth-round pick in 2017 to New Jersey in exchange for Boston's second-round pick in 2017 and this pick.
New Jersey previously acquired this pick as the result of a trade on February 4, 2017, that sent Vernon Fiddler to Nashville in exchange for this pick.
 The Pittsburgh Penguins' fourth-round pick went to the Toronto Maple Leafs as the result of a trade on March 1, 2017, that sent Frank Corrado to Pittsburgh in exchange for Eric Fehr, Steve Oleksy and this pick.

Round five

Notes
 The Vancouver Canucks' fifth-round pick went to the Arizona Coyotes as the result of a trade on June 24, 2017, that sent Calgary's third-round pick in 2017 (78th overall) to Edmonton in exchange for St. Louis' third-round pick in 2017 (82nd overall) and this pick.
Edmonton previously acquired this pick as the result of a trade on February 24, 2016, that sent Philip Larsen to Vancouver in exchange for this pick (being conditional at the time of the trade). The condition — Edmonton will receive a fifth-round pick in 2017 if Larsen fails to maintain a scoring rate of 0.3 points per game over the 2016–17 NHL season with a minimum of 42 games played — was converted on March 4, 2017, when it became mathematically impossible for Larsen to appear in 42 games during the 2016–17 season.
 The Buffalo Sabres' fifth-round pick went to the St. Louis Blues as the result of a trade on July 2, 2016, that sent Anders Nilsson to Buffalo in exchange for this pick.
 The Carolina Hurricanes' fifth-round pick went to the Vancouver Canucks as the result of a trade on June 24, 2017, that sent San Jose's fourth-round pick in 2017 (112th overall) to Chicago in exchange for a sixth-round pick in 2017 (181st overall) and this pick.
Chicago previously acquired this pick as the result of a trade on September 11, 2015, that sent Kris Versteeg, Joakim Nordstrom and a third-round pick in 2017 to Carolina in exchange for Dennis Robertson, Jake Massie and this pick.
 The Tampa Bay Lightning's fifth-round pick went to the Los Angeles Kings as the result of a trade on February 26, 2017, that sent Peter Budaj, Erik Cernak, a conditional pick in 2017 and a seventh-round pick in 2017 in exchange for Ben Bishop and this pick.
 The Boston Bruins' fifth-round pick went to the Vegas Golden Knights as the result of a trade on June 21, 2017, that ensured that Vegas selected Connor Brickley in the 2017 NHL Expansion Draft from Carolina in exchange for this pick.
Carolina previously acquired this pick as the result of a trade on February 29, 2016, that sent John-Michael Liles to Boston in exchange for Anthony Camara, a third-round pick in 2016 and this pick.
 The San Jose Sharks' fifth-round pick went to the New Jersey Devils as the result of a trade on June 17, 2017, that sent Boston's second-round pick and Nashville's fourth-round pick both in 2017 to San Jose in exchange for Mirco Muller and this pick.
 The St. Louis Blues' fifth-round pick went to the Chicago Blackhawks as the result of a trade on June 25, 2016, that sent a Florida's fifth-round pick in 2016 to St. Louis in exchange for this pick.
 The Ottawa Senators' fifth-round pick went to the Pittsburgh Penguins as the result of a trade on November 2, 2016, that sent Mike Condon to Ottawa exchange for this pick.

Round six

Notes
 The Colorado Avalanche's sixth-round pick was re-acquired as the result of a trade on June 27, 2015, that sent Buffalo's second-round pick in 2015 to San Jose in exchange for a second-round pick in 2015, Colorado's second-round pick in 2016 and this pick.
San Jose previously acquired this pick as the result of a trade on July 1, 2014, that sent Brad Stuart to Colorado in exchange for a second-round pick in 2016 and this pick.
 The Vancouver Canucks' sixth-round pick went to the New York Rangers as the result of a trade on January 8, 2016, that sent Emerson Etem to Vancouver in exchange for Nicklas Jensen and this pick.
 The Arizona Coyotes' sixth-round pick went to the San Jose Sharks as the result of a trade on June 20, 2016, that sent a fourth-round pick in 2016 and Detroit's third-round pick in 2017 to Arizona in exchange for Maxim Letunov and this pick.
 The Buffalo Sabres' sixth-round pick went to the Vegas Golden Knights as the result of a trade on June 21, 2017, that ensured that Vegas selected William Carrier in the 2017 NHL Expansion Draft from Buffalo in exchange for this pick.
 The Florida Panthers' sixth-round pick went to the Detroit Red Wings as the result of a trade on February 27, 2016, that sent Jakub Kindl to Florida in exchange for this pick.
 The Los Angeles Kings' sixth-round pick went to the New York Islanders as the result of a trade on June 24, 2017, that sent a sixth-round pick in 2018 to Los Angeles in exchange for this pick.
 The New York Islanders' sixth-round pick went to the Columbus Blue Jackets as the result of a trade on June 23, 2017, that sent Brandon Saad, Anton Forsberg and a fifth-round pick in 2018 to Chicago in exchange for Artemi Panarin, Tyler Motte and this pick.
Chicago previously acquired this pick as the result of a trade on June 25, 2016, that sent Columbus' fourth-round pick in 2016 to New York in exchange for a fourth-round pick in 2016 and this pick.
 The San Jose Sharks' sixth-round pick went to the New York Rangers as the result of a trade on June 24, 2017, that sent Florida's fourth-round pick in 2017 (102nd overall) to San Jose in exchange for Nashville's fourth-round pick in 2017 (123rd overall) and this pick.
 The New York Rangers' sixth-round pick went to the Nashville Predators as the result of a trade on July 1, 2015, that sent Magnus Hellberg to New York in exchange for this pick.
 The Montreal Canadiens' sixth-round pick went to the Tampa Bay Lightning as the result of a trade on January 26, 2017, that sent Nikita Nesterov to Montreal in exchange for Jonathan Racine and this pick.
 The Chicago Blackhawks' sixth-round pick went to the Vancouver Canucks as the result of a trade on June 24, 2017, that sent San Jose's fourth-round pick in 2017 (112th overall) to Chicago in exchange for Carolina's fifth-round pick in 2017 (135th overall) and this pick.
 The Anaheim Ducks' sixth-round pick went to the Florida Panthers as the result of a trade on December 4, 2014, that sent Colby Robak to Anaheim in exchange for Jesse Blacker and this pick (being conditional at the time of the trade). The condition — Florida will receive a sixth-round pick in 2017 dependent on how many games Robak played for Anaheim during the 2014–15 NHL season — the date of conversion is unknown.
 The Nashville Predators' sixth-round pick went to the San Jose Sharks as the result of a trade on June 24, 2017, that sent San Jose and Ottawa's seventh-round picks in 2017 (205th and 214th overall) to New Jersey in exchange for this pick.
New Jersey previously acquired this pick as the result of a trade on March 1, 2017, that sent P. A. Parenteau to Nashville in exchange for this pick.

Round seven

Notes
 The Florida Panthers' seventh-round pick went to the Boston Bruins as the result of a trade on June 25, 2016, that sent a seventh-round pick in 2016 to Florida in exchange for this pick.
 The Los Angeles Kings' seventh-round pick went to the Philadelphia Flyers as the result of a trade on March 1, 2017, that sent Mark Streit to Tampa Bay in exchange for Valtteri Filppula, a fourth-round pick in 2017 and this pick (being conditional at the time of the trade). The condition – Philadelphia will receive Los Angeles' seventh-round pick in 2017 if Tampa Bay trades Streit – was converted on March 1, 2017, when Streit was traded to Pittsburgh.
Tampa Bay previously acquired this pick as the result of a trade on February 26, 2017, that sent Ben Bishop and a fifth-round pick in 2017 to Los Angeles in exchange for Peter Budaj, Erik Cernak, a conditional pick in 2017 and this pick.
 The Philadelphia Flyers' seventh-round pick went to the Montreal Canadiens as the result of a trade on June 24, 2017, that sent a seventh-round pick in 2018 to Philadelphia in exchange for this pick.
 The San Jose Sharks' seventh-round pick went to the New Jersey Devils as the result of a trade on June 24, 2017, that sent Nashville's sixth-round pick in 2017 (185th overall) to San Jose in exchange for Ottawa's seventh-round pick in 2017 (214th overall) and this pick.
 The Montreal Canadiens' seventh-round pick went to the Winnipeg Jets as the result of a trade on June 25, 2016, that sent a seventh-round pick in 2016 to Montreal in exchange for this pick.
 The Chicago Blackhawks' seventh-round pick went to the San Jose Sharks as the result of a trade on March 2, 2015, that sent Andrew Desjardins to Chicago in exchange for Ben Smith and this pick (being conditional at the time of the trade). The condition – San Jose will receive a seventh-round pick in 2017 if Chicago wins the Stanley Cup in 2015 – was converted on June 15, 2015.
 The Ottawa Senators' seventh-round pick went to the New Jersey Devils as the result of a trade on June 24, 2017, that sent Nashville's sixth-round pick in 2017 (185th overall) to San Jose in exchange for a seventh-round pick in 2017 (205th overall) and this pick.
San Jose previously acquired this pick as the result of a trade on January 24, 2017, that sent Tommy Wingels to Ottawa in exchange for Buddy Robinson, Zack Stortini and this pick.
 The Anaheim Ducks' seventh-round pick went to the Chicago Blackhawks as the result of a trade on February 29, 2016, that sent Corey Tropp to Anaheim in exchange for Tim Jackman and this pick.

Draftees based on nationality

North American draftees by state/province

See also
 2013–14 NHL transactions
 2014–15 NHL transactions
 2015–16 NHL transactions
 2016–17 NHL transactions
 2017–18 NHL transactions
 2017–18 NHL season
 2017 NHL Expansion Draft
 List of first overall NHL draft picks
 List of NHL players

References

External links
2017 NHL Entry Draft player stats at The Internet Hockey Database

NHL Entry Draft
National Hockey League Entry Draft
Entry Draft
2017 in sports in Illinois
Ice hockey in Chicago
NHL Entry Draft
2010s in Chicago